Morgan Phillips was a Welsh Labour Party organiser.

Morgan Phillips may also refer to:

Morgan Phillips (priest) (died 1570), Welsh academic and Roman Catholic priest 
Morgan Hector Phillips (1885–1953), Welsh headmaster of Ruthin School
Morgan W. Phillips (1943–1996), American architectural conservationist
The Sucklord (born c.1969), American pop artist, real name Morgan Phillips
Morgan Phillips (sport shooter) (born 1998), American sport shooter
Morgan Phillips (tennis) (born 1984), British tennis coach